Xandrames is a genus of moths in the family Geometridae described by Frederic Moore in 1868.

Species
Xandrames albofasciata Moore, 1868
Xandrames dholaria Moore, 1868
Xandrames latiferaria (Walker, 1860)
Xandrames opisthochroma Prout, 1928
Xandrames postmarginata Wileman & South, 1917
Xandrames xanthomelanaria Poujade, 1895
Xandrames xanthos Sato, 1996

References

Boarmiini
Heteroneura genera